Sea of Red is an American comic book series published from 2005 to 2006 by Image Comics. Featuring 16th century vampire pirates, the series was written by Rick Remender and Kieron Dwyer and drawn by Salgood Sam and Paul Harmon.

Collected editions
The series has been collected into trade paperbacks:
No Grave But the Sea (collects #1-4, 104 pages, September 2005, December 2006)
No Quarter (collects #5-8, 104 pages, March 2006)
The Deadlights (collects #9-13, 120 pages, December 2007)

A limited edition hardcover slipcase collection of the three trade paperbacks was released in May 2010.

Notes

References

Sea of Red at the Comics DB

External links

Monster and Critics - Sea of Red and Invincible Sell Out

Reviews

Sea of Red Vol. 1 Review, IGN
Sea of Red #1, Read About Comics
Sea of Red, BoingBoing
Sea of Red Review - Movie Poop Shoot
Sea of Red #1 - Best of the Week!, The Fourth Rail
Sea of Red #3, The Comics Reporter

2005 comics debuts
2006 comics endings
Pirate comics
Comics set in the 16th century
Comics by Rick Remender
Image Comics vampires